Watford Football Club is a football club from Watford, Hertfordshire, England. The club played in the 2012–13 Football League Championship for the sixth consecutive season since relegation from the Premier League in 2006–07. The club also competed in the FA Cup and the Football League Cup.

Despite guiding the club to an 11th-placed finish in 2009–10, the club's 3rd highest points tally for 9 years, manager Sean Dyche was dismissed and replaced by Gianfranco Zola following the club's takeover by Udinese and Granada owner Giampaolo Pozzo. The club captain was central midfielder John Eustace, although due to injury, Goalkeeper Manuel Almunia was captain for the majority of the season. During the summer transfer window, the club sold two key first team players; academy graduate Adrian Mariappa and goalkeeper Scott Loach. To replace them, Watford brought in two experienced players in Manuel Almunia and Fitz Hall. All other incoming transfers were loan players, mainly from Udinese and Granada. Zola later revealed that the club only loaned the players due to the short time scale between the completion of the take over and the transfer deadline day.

Watford had a relatively poor start to the season, losing 7 of their first 13 games, including a heavy 5–1 loss to Derby County F.C. In the subsequent months however, Watford began to win more matches and started to climb the table, rising to hold the 6th position by the end of 2012. Towards the end of the season, Watford were in contention for an automatic promotion spot together with Hull. On a dramatic final day of the regular season, Hull failed to guarantee their automatic promotion by only drawing to league champions Cardiff, however Watford were unable to capitalise against Leeds and finished the season in 3rd place, entering the play-offs. Over two games, Watford beat Leicester City on aggregate in a dramatic semi-final that saw them face Crystal Palace in the play-off final at Wembley where Crystal Palace won and sealed promotion to the Premier League.

Background

Sean Dyche replaced Malky Mackay as Watford manager at the end of the 2010–11 season. Following the departures of Mackay, Danny Graham, Will Buckley and Don Cowie, Watford were tipped for relegation in 2011–12 by some bookmakers and media organisations. However, Watford finished the season in 11th place with 64 points; Watford's third highest points tally since the departure of Graham Taylor as manager in 2001. At the end of the season, it was confirmed that Rene Gilmartin, Michael Bryan, Josh Walker, Chez Isaac and Tom James would be released – their contracts expired at the end of the 2011–12 season. Former manager Graham Taylor stepped down as chairman shortly before UEFA Euro 2012, indicating that he felt the timing was right and that he was keen to pursue other interests.

Takeover
In June 2012, Laurence Bassini indicated that he was looking to sell the club. Amid reports that the club's bondholders had called in the debt due to an act of default, Bassini stressed that the decision to sell was his alone, motivated by a wish to spend more time with his family. A company owned by Giampaolo Pozzo and his family completed the takeover of Watford on 29 June 2012. The management structure of the club changed significantly in the following weeks, with Rafaelle Riva appointed chairman. Former West Ham United chief executive Scott Duxbury and technical director Gianluca Nani took up similar roles with Watford, while ex-West Ham manager Gianfranco Zola replaced Sean Dyche. The club also stated an intention to make use of the Pozzo family's scouting network, which identifies players for Udinese in Serie A and Granada in La Liga.

Pre season
Watford did not make any signings prior to the start of their pre-season campaign, but their first two games against local featured triallists Daniel Pudil and Almen Abdi. In both matches – away to Boreham Wood and Wealdstone – Watford changed all eleven players at half time. Both games finished as 1–1 draws. The team's first win of pre-season came in a visit to Irish side Cork City, and was followed by an 8–0 win in a match against Barnet at Watford's training ground in London Colney.

Watford's only pre-season game at Vicarage Road was a testimonial match for defender Lloyd Doyley, who started his professional career at the club in 2001. Before the start of the game, Doyley entered the pitch to a guard of honour, and when he was substituted with 15 minutes remaining he was given a standing ovation by supporters. However, a goal from Tottenham's Jermain Defoe gave the visitors a 1–0 victory. Watford finished their pre-season schedule with a 3–0 win at Gillingham, with two goals from Matěj Vydra and one from Piero Mingoia.

Championship

Championship play-offs

Football League Cup
The Football League Championship season started later than usual, due to the Olympic games being held in London. Thus, Watford's first competitive game was in the League Cup, at home to League Two side Wycombe Wanderers. The game saw few chances, and was goalless after 90 minutes. Substitute Chris Iwelumo scored the winner for Watford in extra time, assisted by debutant Matěj Vydra. In the next round, Watford again hosted League Two opposition in the form of eventual cup runners up Bradford City. After a goalless first half, Ikechi Anya put Watford into the lead in the 71st minute, on his first start for the club. However, Bradford scored two late goals to win the match 2–1. Both of Bradford's goals were scored shortly after direct free kicks.

FA Cup
Premier League and Championship clubs enter the FA Cup at the third round stage, where they are joined by the 20 winners from the second round for a total of 64 teams. The draw took place on 2 December 2012. Watford were drawn away to 2011 winners and eventual finalists Manchester City where Manchester City won thanks to goals from Tevez, Barry and Lopes.

League table

Summary

Players

Statistics

No. = Squad number

Pos = Playing position

P = Number of games played

G = Number of goals scored

 = Yellow cards

GK = Goalkeeper

DF = Defender

MF = Midfielder

FW = Forward

 = Red cards

Yth = Whether player went through Watford's youth system

Joined club = Year that player became a Watford first team player

Age = Age at end of season (27 May 2013)

 Loan player

Statistics correct as of game played 27 May 2013.

Transfers
Unless a country is specified, all clubs play in the English football league system.

In
The transfer window opened on 1 July, but Watford did not make any signings in the early part of pre-season, amid reports that the club was under a transfer embargo due to an administrative error. The club confirmed seven signings at the end of July, five of which were season long loans from other clubs owned by the Pozzo family. The permanent transfers were goalkeeper Manuel Almunia and centre back Fitz Hall, following the departures of Scott Loach and Adrian Mariappa in their respective positions.

Out

At the end of the 2011–12 season, the club announced that five players would be released at the end of their contracts. The summer transfer window opened on 1 July, and two high-profile departures followed during pre-season. 2011–12 Player of the Season Adrian Mariappa joined newly promoted Premier League side Reading on 17 July. Two days later, Scott Loach – the team's most-used goalkeeper from the previous season – transferred to Ipswich Town, the club he supported as a child. The club's final sale of the summer was Martin Taylor to Sheffield Wednesday. Taylor extended his contract shortly before Sean Dyche's departure from the club, and captained the team during his final two games under Gianfranco Zola, but was allowed to leave on the final day of the transfer window.

Loans

In
Watford signed 14 players on season-long loans in the summer transfer window. 12 players joined from clubs also owned by the Pozzo family; 10 from Udinese and 2 from Granada. Watford also signed Nathaniel Chalobah and Geoffrey Mujangi Bia from Chelsea and Standard Liège respectively. Jean-Alain Fanchone returned to Udinese in January, while Fernando Forestieri also signed a permanent contract with Watford that month. The club added a 15th loan player in March, with Matthew Briggs joining from Fulham until the end of the season.

Out

Reserves and academy
Watford's academy intake in 2012-13 consisted of 21 scholars:
 In the second year, defenders Kyle Connolly and Jordan Wilmore, midfielders Austin Eaton, Luke O'Nien, Jack Westlake, and striker Bernard Mensah.
 In the first year, goalkeeper Daniel Wilks, defenders Jazzi Barnum Bobb, Oliver Crowley, Josh Doherty and Jorell Johnson, midfielders Bobson Bawling, George Byers, Ollie Cox, Kurtis Cumberbatch, Chris Dillon, Ryan Hope, and Robert Westcott, and strikers Jamie Calvin-Pay and Alex Jakubiak.

In addition, defender Matt Bevans had his scholarship from the previous year extended by a number of months after an injury kept him out for most of the previous season. In July 2011, Mensah signed a contract that saw him turn professional on his 17th birthday, later signing an extended contract in January 2013. In June 2013 O'Nien signed a one-year professional deal with the club, while Connolly, Wilmore, Eaton and English were released. Westlake was offered an extension to his scholarship of six months after missing a large period of the season through injury.

Notes

References

Watford F.C. seasons
Watford